UFC on ESPN: Smith vs. Clark (also known as UFC on ESPN 18 and UFC Vegas 15) was a mixed martial arts event produced by the Ultimate Fighting Championship that took place on November 28, 2020, at the UFC Apex facility in Enterprise, Nevada, part of the Las Vegas Metropolitan Area, United States.

Background 
A heavyweight bout between Curtis Blaydes and former UFC Heavyweight Championship challenger Derrick Lewis was expected to serve as the event headliner. However, Blaydes tested positive for COVID-19 a day before the event and the bout was cancelled. 

Shamil Gamzatov was briefly linked to a fight with Devin Clark at the event. However, Gamzatov was removed from the bout in mid-October due to alleged visa issues and replaced by former UFC Light Heavyweight Championship challenger Anthony Smith. Originally scheduled to be a three-round co-main event, this bout was promoted to serve as the new five-round headliner after the cancellation of the original main event. 

A featherweight bout between Sean Woodson and Jonathan Pearce was scheduled for the event. However, Woodson withdrew a week before the event due to unknown reasons and was replaced by Kai Kamaka III.

Renato Moicano and Rafael Fiziev were expected to meet in a lightweight bout at this event. However, Moicano pulled out on November 21 after testing positive for COVID-19 and the bout was rescheduled for UFC 256.

A flyweight bout between Amir Albazi and Zhalgas Zhumagulov was expected to take place at this event. However, it was announced on November 24 that Zhumagulov pulled out due to visa issues and the bout was rescheduled for UFC 257.

At the weigh-ins, Norma Dumont Viana weighed in at 139.5 pounds, three and a half pounds over the women's bantamweight non-title fight limit. Her bout proceeded at catchweight and she was fined 30% of her individual purse, which went to her opponent Ashlee Evans-Smith.

Results

Bonus awards
The following fighters received $50,000 bonuses.
Fight of the Night: No bonus awarded.
Performance of the Night: Anthony Smith, Miguel Baeza, Su Mudaerji and Nathan Maness

See also 

 List of UFC events
 List of current UFC fighters
 2020 in UFC

References 

UFC on ESPN
2020 in mixed martial arts
2020 in sports in Nevada
Mixed martial arts in Las Vegas
Sports competitions in Las Vegas
November 2020 sports events in the United States